COVID-19 deaths may refer to:

 , for information about the mortality of COVID-19
 COVID-19 pandemic deaths, for statistics on COVID-19 deaths by region
 COVID-19 pandemic death rates by country, for statistics on COVID-19 death rates by country
 List of deaths due to COVID-19, for a list of notable people who have died from COVID-19